Íñigo Peña Arriola (born 7 September 1990) is a Spanish sprint canoer.

Career
He competed at the 2016 Summer Olympics in Rio de Janeiro, in the men's K-4 1000 metres.

References

External links

1990 births
Living people
Spanish male canoeists
People from Urola Kosta
Olympic canoeists of Spain
Canoeists at the 2016 Summer Olympics
Canoeists at the 2020 Summer Olympics
ICF Canoe Sprint World Championships medalists in kayak
Sportspeople from Gipuzkoa
European Games competitors for Spain
Canoeists at the 2019 European Games
Canoeists from the Basque Country (autonomous community)
21st-century Spanish people